The Gulf of Corinth or the Corinthian Gulf (Korinthiakόs Kόlpos) is a deep inlet of the Ionian Sea, separating the Peloponnese from western mainland Greece. It is bounded in the east by the Isthmus of Corinth which includes the shipping-designed Corinth Canal and in the west by the Strait of Rion which widens into the shorter Gulf of Patras (part of the Ionian Sea) and of which the narrowest point is crossed since 2004 by the Rio–Antirrio bridge. The gulf is bordered by the large administrative divisions (regional units): Aetolia-Acarnania and Phocis in the north, Boeotia in the northeast, Attica in the east, Corinthia in the southeast and south and Achaea in the southwest.

In the Middle Ages, the gulf was known as the Gulf of Lepanto (the Italian form of Naupactus).

Shipping routes between the Greek commercial port Piraeus (further away from ultimate destinations but larger and better connected to the south than the north-western Greek port of Igoumenitsa) to western Mediterranean and hemisphere ports pass along this gulf. A ferry crosses the gulf to link Aigio and Agios Nikolaos, towards the western part of the gulf.

Geology

The surrounding faults can produce earthquakes up to magnitude around 6.5, though they are relatively uncommon. On June 15, 1995 an earthquake of magnitude 6.2 occurred near the city of Aigion. A large part of the northern margin of gulf is characterized by gentle gradients (between 10 and 20 degrees). The southern margin of the gulf is largely characterized by steep gradients (between 30 and 40 degrees).

Nature

Cetaceans such as fin whales or dolphins are known to enter the Corinthian gulf occasionally.

Gulfs and bays
Alkyonides Gulf, east
Crissaean Gulf (Gulf of Crissa), north
Bay of Antikyra, north
Dombraina (Domvrena), north
Strait of Rion, west

Islands
Trizonia (the only inhabited), Alkyonides Islands (group of islets), Ampelos (islet), Fonias (islet), Prasoudi (islet)

Bridges
Rio–Antirrio bridge

Cities and towns
The main cities and towns that lie next to the gulf are, from the northwest clockwise, and grouped by regional unit:
Aetolia-Acarnania: Antirrio, Nafpaktos
Phocis: Galaxidi, Itea, Kirra
Boeotia: Antikyra, Paralia Distomou
West Attica
Corinthia: Loutraki, Corinth, Assos, Vrachati, Velo, Kiato, Kato Diminio, Xylokastro
Achaea: Aigeira, Diakopto, Aigio, Rododafni, Agios Vasileios, Aktaio

Tributaries

All tributaries are listed west to east.

Northern
Mornos 
Pleistos

Southern
Selemnos 
Volinaios
Foinikas
Selinountas
Vouraikos
Krathis
Krios
Zacholitikos
Fonissa
Sythas
Elissonas
Asopos

References

External links

 The Corinth Rift Observatory

 
Corinth, Gulf of
Landforms of Aetolia-Acarnania
Landforms of Phocis
Landforms of Boeotia
Landforms of Corinthia
Landforms of Attica
Landforms of Achaea
Landforms of Western Greece
Landforms of Central Greece
Landforms of Peloponnese (region)
Inlets of Greece